Ice water may refer to:

Music 
 Ice Water (song), a song from Cat Power's second album Myra Lee
 Ice Water (album), an album by guitarist Leo Kottke
 Ice Water Inc., a music group affiliated with the Wu Tang Clan

Other uses 
 Ice Water (horse), a thoroughbred racehorse

See also 
 Cold pressor test, a cardiovascular test performed by immersing the hand into ice water
 Ice
 Water ice (disambiguation)